VCU Medical Center Station, located at the corner of Broad and 12th, is a Richmond, Virginia bus station site of the GRTC Bus Rapid Transit route.

Station layout

History 
In 2016 the station was planned to be named the 12th street station. In 2017, it was changed to the VCU Hospital station. In 2018 it changed again to its current planned name, the VCU Medical Center station.

References

External links
 VCU Medical Center station

Buildings and structures in Richmond, Virginia
GRTC Pulse stations
Transport infrastructure completed in 2018
Bus stations in Virginia
2018 establishments in Virginia